Vlieger is a 98% Black African village in Dr Kenneth Kaunda District Municipality, North West Province, South Africa.

References

Populated places in the JB Marks Local Municipality